Bright.com was an employment website that uses a computer algorithm to match potential employee to advertised positions. Bright Media was the parent company of Bright.com and Bright Labs, a group that provided access to data and resources on the current job market. Bright Media was led by CEO Steve Goodman.

Bright was founded in February 2011. Steve Goodman has held the position of CEO since the company's inception. The site hosted 2.1 million job descriptions.

Bright.com's jobs matching business was acquired by LinkedIn in February 2014 for $120 million.

References

External links 
 
 

Employment websites in the United States
LinkedIn
Business services companies established in 2011
2014 mergers and acquisitions
Business services companies disestablished in the 21st century